Charles Phillip Mead (9 March 1887 – 26 March 1958) was an English first-class cricketer. He played as a left-handed batsman for Hampshire and England between 1905 and 1936. He was born at 10 Ashton Buildings (since pulled down), second eldest of seven children. As a child he played for South London Schools, attending Shillingstone Street School.

His exceptionally straight bat and quick footwork (surprising for a man of heavy build as he was) made him one of the most difficult batsmen to dismiss throughout his career. His mastery over the best county spin bowlers even on the most treacherous pitches is remarkable, but he could also be very good against the fastest bowling because he could get closer into line than just about any batsman in cricket history.

Mead holds many batting records, notably that of scoring the most runs in the County Championship and the fourth-highest total in all first-class matches. His number of runs for Hampshire, 48,892, is the greatest number any batsman has scored for a single team. He also exceeded one thousand runs in every season of first-class cricket except his first – when he only played one match. He was also a fine fieldsman, holding 675 catches.

Cricket career
C. B. Fry spotted Mead playing as a schoolboy at the Oval and encouraged him to become a professional; he joined the Surrey ground staff in 1902.

Mead first trialled for Surrey, but qualified for Hampshire because Surrey's batting strength was such that they were unable to offer him a contract. It is possible that Fry's Hampshire connections (he had a Training Ship Mercury on the River Hamble) helped bring Mead to Hampshire. During his residence qualification period Mead worked in coaching naval trainees, and might have made his first-class debut at 17 for Players of the South against the Gentleman, but was vetoed by W G Grace who objected because of his age.

After one match against the touring Australians when not qualified in 1905, Mead immediately became a regular with Hampshire, but faltered after a promising beginning including 109 against Yorkshire.

However, from 1907 onwards Mead, at this stage an opening batsman, advanced very rapidly, with his average reaching 39 in the very wet summer of 1909. In 1911, he moved down the order to his familiar position of number four, and so successful was this move that he was the leading run-scorer in 1911 and 1913, and toured Australia in 1911–12 and South Africa in 1913–14. He was not nearly so successful as might have been expected in Australia, but in South Africa he hit a Test century and played particularly well throughout. In 1912 he had been unbeaten (160* and 33*) in Hampshire's historic win over the Australians at Southampton.

After World War I halted county cricket (Mead was rejected from active service because of varicose veins), Mead's list of achievements grew, as his always-remarkable watchfulness and superb footwork made him the complete master of bowlers such as Tich Freeman who were deadly against batsmen of poorer technique. In 1921, after missing the first three Tests against Australia, Mead hit 182 not out at The Oval in the last Test – showing that England seriously erred in not choosing him for the earlier games when Jack Gregory and Ted McDonald had a complete mastery over their batsmen. He also hit his highest score of 280 not out that year against Nottinghamshire. Hampshire, remarkably, lost the match as they had been bowled out cheaply on a good wicket in their first innings.

Between 1922 and 1928, Mead was consistently one of the top batsmen in county cricket, but England's remarkable batting strength – with men like Herbert Sutcliffe, Wally Hammond, Jack Hobbs and Frank Woolley – meant Mead had few opportunities at Test level. After scoring over 3000 runs in 1928, Mead toured Australia for the second time, but was dropped after one Test so as to make room for another bowler.

In 1929, affected by injury, Mead declined substantially, failing to reach 2000 runs for the first time since the war. However, despite no longer being in the front rank of English batsmen, Mead was still feared for his great technical skill and reached a thousand runs every year until, at the age of forty-nine in 1936, he was not re-engaged by Hampshire. In his last innings, Mead played a superbly skilful 52 against Hedley Verity on a badly wearing wicket, and he played for Suffolk in the Minor Counties Championship with considerable success in 1938 and 1939 while cricket coach at Framlingham College.

He had predictable mannerisms – having got to the crease with his "rolling, self-reliant" walk, he took guard, twirled his bat, tapped his bat in the crease and took several shuffling steps up to it. Before every ball he would tug his cap. His batting was not slow, but completely unhurried; a spectator once described him as having 'stone-walled' from a quarter to one to half past six for 200.

Soon after World War II, problems with his eyes which had begun in 1941–2 led to Mead becoming totally blind, but he never complained about this. His financial worries were assuaged by a fund raised by Herbert Sutcliffe for Mead and Len Braund. He retained a great interest in cricket and often attended Hampshire matches at Dean Park right up to his death on 26 March 1958.

Football career
In 1907, Mead signed for Southampton for one season to assist the club's reserve team as a useful inside-forward, but he had no intention of taking up football as a full-time occupation. On 21 December 1907, he was at Fratton Park, Portsmouth for a reserve fixture when he was summoned to The Dell where the Saints had an emergency as both regular goalkeepers, Herbert Lock and Tom Burrows were unavailable through injury. Mead therefore played in goal in a Southern League match against West Ham United. According to Holley & Chalk's "The Alphabet of the Saints" he "shaped up well but was only required to save two shots and kept a blank sheet in a 0–0 draw."

Family
Married to Beatrice Englefield in 1908, he had two sons, Ronald and Frank. Beatrice's brother, Frank Englefield, was also a professional footballer, playing for both Southampton and Fulham.

References

External links 

1887 births
1958 deaths
Association football goalkeepers
England Test cricketers
English cricketers
East of England cricketers
English footballers
Hampshire cricketers
Marylebone Cricket Club cricketers
Players cricketers
Footballers from Battersea
Cricketers from Greater London
Southampton F.C. players
Southern Football League players
Suffolk cricketers
Wisden Cricketers of the Year
English cricketers of 1919 to 1945
C. I. Thornton's XI cricketers
North v South cricketers
L. H. Tennyson's XI cricket team
Lord Londesborough's XI cricketers
P. F. Warner's XI cricketers
Marylebone Cricket Club Australian Touring Team cricketers
Marylebone Cricket Club South African Touring Team cricketers